Rostamkela (Persian: رستمکلا, also Romanized as Rostamkelā, Rostam Kelā, and Rostam Kalā; also known as Rostam Kūlā and Rustam Qal‘eh) is a city in the Central District of Behshahr County, Mazandaran Province, Iran.  At the 2006 census, its population was 11,306, in 3,055 families.

The origin of the name 'Rostamkela' is not known for certain, but local folklore connects it with a man named Rostam (to be identified possibly with the legendary warrior of that name) who helped unite the people of the area.

The main economic activity is based on Agriculture. Other productions are Avi-culture, Brick manufacturing, Flour manufacturing, Metal Industries and Limestone.

The first school was built in 1925. In addition, Rostamkela has a religious school that was built by Allameh Ayazi.

During the Second World War the Trans-Iranian railway was constructed and Rostamkela Depot was built at the same time.
There is a special railway which conveys from Rostamkela to Amir Abad seaport and a special road will be opened between them soon.

Qanat was used to provide reliable supply water for irrigation in Rostamkela.
Rostamkela is located in ancient district which included Gorji Mahale, Asiabsar, Kouhestan, Troujan villages.
Gohar Tape is a city (1800–3000 BC) mounded near Rostamkela.

Rostamkela had a powerful economy 200 years ago because we can see historical buildings that were built about 200 years ago for example Soltani tekye, Haj Hasan tekye, Alizade hoseinie, Farahi hoseinie, Rostamkelaei and Tavakeli Houses.
The Imamzade building was built 800 years ago.

There are many beautiful places in Rostamkela just like Mirevoun (Mehravan, a famous place that is located in jungle).
It is being used by people for picnic.

The descendants of Rostamkela's original "founders" are still to be found here, and they can relate numerous stories concerning the founding of the city. In all these stories obtained from numerous descendants, it is believed and confirmed that their ancestors were of noble lineage. The origin of this noble lineage is unknown, yet the suspicions are strengthened by numerous anecdotes. All are linked to a man with deep-set blue eyes who settled the land, where after the village slowly grew into a town. The descendants often have blue eyes, though also green and brown. The descendants believe steadfastly that they are of noble lineage, though their exact ancestry is unknown. The land has been filled with Persian and Parthian nobles throughout the ages.

References

Populated places in Behshahr County
Cities in Mazandaran Province